Gregory Christopher Lukianoff (born 1974) is an American journalist, author and activist who serves as the president of the Foundation for Individual Rights and Expression (FIRE). He previously served as FIRE's first director of legal and public advocacy until he was appointed president in 2006.

Life 
Born in Manhattan, New York City, in 1974, Lukianoff is a graduate of American University and Stanford Law School.

Work

Lukianoff has published articles in the Los Angeles Times, The Boston Globe, The Chronicle of Higher Education, The Atlantic, Inside Higher Ed, and the New York Post. His article in The Atlantic, "The Coddling of the American Mind" discussed whether or not trigger warnings are harming college health. He is a blogger for The Huffington Post and served as a regular columnist for the Daily Journal of Los Angeles and San Francisco. Along with Harvey Silverglate and David A. French, Lukianoff is a co-author of FIRE's Guide to Free Speech on Campus. 

He testified before the United States Congress on the state of free speech on college campuses, and he appeared in the films Brainwashing 101 and Indoctrinate U on the same topic. He has made numerous appearances on nationally syndicated news broadcasts, like CNN and FOX News.

He has also appeared on various news shows, including Stossel on more than one occasion. Before joining FIRE, Lukianoff interned with the American Civil Liberties Union of Northern California and the Organization for Aid to Refugees, and was a development coordinator for the EnvironMentors Project. He lives in New York City.

Lukianoff and his co-author Jonathan Haidt were awarded the Hugh M. Hefner First Amendment Award in 2019 for their book The Coddling of the American Mind.

He served as executive producer on the 2015 documentary about self-censorship and cultural awareness in comedy, Can We Take a Joke?, and the 2020 documentary about former ACLU executive director Ira Glasser's mission to defend Nazis' right to protest in a Jewish residential area, which caused 30,000 members to leave the ACLU.

Works

References

External links 
 FIRE – Lukianoff profile
 

1974 births
21st-century American lawyers
21st-century atheists
Activists from New York City
American atheists
American University alumni
Free speech activists
HuffPost writers and columnists
Living people
People from Brooklyn
People from Danbury, Connecticut
People from Manhattan
Stanford Law School alumni